Meramec Township is an inactive township in Franklin County, in the U.S. state of Missouri.

Meramec Township was established in 1819, taking its name from the Meramec River.

References

Townships in Missouri
Townships in Franklin County, Missouri